Anne-Hyacinthe de Saint-Léger de Colleville (26 March 1761 – 18 November 1824) was a French novelist and dramatist.

Works 
Novels
1781: Lettres du chevalier de saint Alme et de Mlle de Melcourt
1782: Alexandrine ou l'amour est une vertu
1802: MMe de M***, ou la rentière
1804: Victor de Martigues
1806: Salut à MM. les maris ou, Rose et d'Orsinval
1816: Coralie

Plays
1783: Le Bouquet du père de famille
1783: Les deux sœurs
1788: Sophie et Derville

References

External links 
 Anne-Hyacinthe de Colleville on data.bnf.fr
 On his relations with Restif de la Bretonne : Mes inscriptions : journal intime de Restif de La Bretonne.

French women novelists
18th-century French novelists
19th-century French novelists
18th-century French dramatists and playwrights
French women dramatists and playwrights
Writers from Paris
1761 births
1824 deaths
19th-century French women writers
18th-century French women writers